Jhon Jairo Romero (born January 17, 1995) is a Colombian professional baseball pitcher in the Cleveland Guardians organization. He made his Major League Baseball (MLB) debut with the Washington Nationals in 2021 and has also played for the Minnesota Twins.

Career

Chicago Cubs
As a boy, Romero played catcher, but he began finding success as a pitcher as he matured. Older than most international amateurs when he joined a professional baseball organization, Romero was 20 years old when the Chicago Cubs signed him out of Colombia in 2015 and assigned him to their Dominican Summer League affiliate. At the time, Cubs scout Manuel Esquivia said the organization envisioned him as a possible future closer, as he touched  in his tryout with the Chicago organization.

After spending two seasons in the Dominican Summer League, Romero was assigned to the Cubs' stateside affiliates in the 2017 season and shot through the low minors, rising from the Arizona League Cubs to the short-season Eugene Emeralds of the Northwest League before finishing out the season with the South Bend Cubs of the Midwest League. He led Cubs relief prospects with a 0.86 ERA and led all minor league pitchers who pitched at least 25 innings with a 0.62 WHIP that year, across the three levels.

Promoted to the Myrtle Beach Pelicans in the Advanced-A Carolina League to begin the 2018 season, Romero posted a 3.27 ERA and 1.30 WHIP over 32 appearances through July.

Washington Nationals
Hours before the Major League Baseball trade deadline on July 31, 2018, the Cubs traded Romero to the Washington Nationals for Brandon Kintzler. Although effective finishing out the year with the Potomac Nationals, Washington's High-A affiliate, Romero struggled in 2019 and was ultimately diagnosed with a torn ulnar collateral ligament of the elbow in his right throwing arm. He underwent Tommy John surgery to replace the damaged ligament, missing the remainder of the 2019 season and not playing in 2020 due to the COVID-19 pandemic.

In the minor leagues in 2021, Romero advanced from the Double-A Harrisburg Senators to the Triple-A Rochester Red Wings. Across those two levels, he put up a 2.62 ERA while appearing in 38 games, all of them as a reliever. On September 23, 2021, the Nationals selected Romero's contract from Rochester and promoted him to the major leagues for the first time. Romero made his major league debut the following day against the Cincinnati Reds, pitching a scoreless inning of relief.

On March 17, 2022, Romero was designated for assignment by the Nationals after the signing of Nelson Cruz was made official.

Minnesota Twins
On March 21, 2022, Romero was claimed off waivers by the Minnesota Twins. He made 4 appearances for the big-league club, recording a 3.60 ERA with 6 strikeouts in 5.0 innings pitched. On May 11, Romero was placed on the 60-day injured list with right biceps inflammation. He would miss the remainder of the season with the injury. He elected free agency on November 10, 2022.

Cleveland Guardians
On March 20, 2023, Romero signed a minor league contract with the Cleveland Guardians organization.

References

External links

1995 births
Living people
Sportspeople from Cartagena, Colombia
Colombian expatriate baseball players in the United States
Colombian expatriate baseball players in the Dominican Republic
Major League Baseball players from Colombia
Major League Baseball pitchers
Washington Nationals players
Minnesota Twins players
Dominican Summer League Cubs players
Arizona League Cubs players
South Bend Cubs players
Eugene Emeralds players
Myrtle Beach Pelicans players
Potomac Nationals players
Harrisburg Senators players
Rochester Red Wings players
2023 World Baseball Classic players